Brvenica is a village in the municipality of Brvenica, North Macedonia. It is the seat of the Brvenica Municipality.

Geography and Location
Located in Lower nest about 7 km south of Tetovo, at an altitude of 440 m, on the left side of the river Temishnica (left tributary of the Vardar River). Throughout the village Brvenica passes and the largest river in North Macedonia - Vardar. The village is located near the mountain Suva Gora, and has an excellent view of the Sar Planina.

Together with the village of Dolno Sedlarce is a large modern settlement.

History
According to the 1467-68 Ottoman defter, Brvenica appears as being inhabited by an Orthodox Christian population. Most families had a mixed Slav-Albanian anthroponomy - usually a Slavic first name and an Albanian last name or last names with Albanian patronyms and Slavic suffixes. 

The names are: Dimitri Arbanas; Gjuri-ca, son of Dimitr; Gjuro, son of Gjin; Rajko, son of Marin; Gjuro, son of Simon; Dimitri his brother;Dod-ka, son of Pavli; Pavli, son of Stok-o; Boja, son of Dimitr.

Economy
On the territory of Brvenica, there are several commercial entities that employ most of the villagers.

Important economic subjects are
 Agriculture Plantage and
 the mill for processing fodder Agro Sloga.

Because the village is located in Polog valley, one of the most fertile plains in the Republic, the population of the village engaged in
 agriculture / farming,
 fruit production and
 intensive farming.

Demographics
As of the 2021 census, Brvenica had 3,102 residents with the following ethnic composition:
Macedonians 2,973
Serbs 37
Persons for whom data are taken from administrative sources 68
Others 24

According to the 2002 census, the village had a total of 2,981 inhabitants.

Ethnic groups in the village include:

Macedonians 2,893
Serbs 21
Albanians 2
Others 2

Much of the population Brvenica is temporarily working in foreign countries: Germany, Italy, UK, USA, Canada, Australia.

Social institutions
The village has eight-year primary school Koco Racin, park in the village where a monument to fallen soldiers during the Liberation.

The village has a standard football field on which football meetings are held.

There is a clinic with a permanent staff physician, and nurses.

In the village there are 
more self-service, 
discotheques, 
coffee bars, 
internet cafes, 
shops.

The village has produced Brvenica and urban plan, which is one of Brvenica most urbanized villages in Macedonia.

Regular events
In a multi Brvenica tradition of holding the following events:
Celebration of Christmas (January 6)
Epiphany (January 19)
The feast of St. Athanasius (31 January) devoted to the church Athanasius in Brvenica
Ilinden celebration of the feast (2 August)

References

External links
Official website

Villages in Brvenica Municipality
Albanian communities in North Macedonia